Ilya Sergeyevich Rosliakov (born February 18, 1983 in Murmansk) is a Russian ski jumper who has been competing since 2003. At the 2010 Winter Olympics in Vancouver, he finished 10th in the team large hill and 44th in the individual large hill events.

Rosliakov's best finish at the FIS Nordic World Ski Championships was sixth in the team large hill event at Sapporo in 2007.

His best individual World Cup finish was 12th in an individual large hill in Austria in 2004.

References

1983 births
Living people
People from Murmansk
Olympic ski jumpers of Russia
Russian male ski jumpers
Ski jumpers at the 2010 Winter Olympics
Sportspeople from Murmansk Oblast